The FIBT World Championships 1994 took place in Altenberg, Germany for the second time, having hosted the event previously in 1991 (Bobsleigh). This was an extraordinary event since skeleton was not included on the program at the 1994 Winter Olympics in Lillehammer, Norway.

Men's skeleton

Medal table

References
Men's skeleton World Champions

1994
1994 in German sport
1994 in skeleton
1994 in bobsleigh
International sports competitions hosted by Germany
Bobsleigh in Germany